Carrick Rangers Football Club is a semi-professional Northern Irish football club playing in NIFL Premiership. The club, founded in 1939, hails from Carrickfergus, County Antrim and plays its home matches at
Taylors Avenue which is known as the Loughview Leisure Arena due to sponsorship reasons, which is owned by Mid and East Antrim Borough Council. Carrick Rangers main rivals are Larne, with matches between the sides being known as, "The East Antrim Derby." Ballyclare Comrades are also local rivals.

History
The club was formed in 1939, when two teams from the Carrickfergus & District Summer League – Barn Mills and Bubbles decided to merge. In 1940, the new club joined the Belfast Minor League and took up residence at Taylors Avenue, then known as the Barn Field They won the County Antrim Junior Shield in 1941–42 and in 1943 gained admission to the Northern Amateur League, of which they were the champions in 1948–49 and 1951–52. 1952 saw the club's elevation to the Intermediate League, necessary ground improvements being made at the Barn Field, now known as Taylors Avenue, and then, following the demise of that competition, to the Irish Alliance in 1954 and eventually the Irish League B Division in 1957. As members of the Alliance, Carrick won the McKelvey Cup, a knock-out cup for league members, in 1956–57.

From 1983 until 2003, the club enjoyed senior status, but reverted to intermediate status when the Irish Premier League was established and the number of senior clubs was reduced from 20 to 16.  The club's greatest achievement was winning the Irish Cup in 1976, when, as a B Division team they beat Linfield in the final in one of the greatest cup shocks.

On 2 May 2011, the club secured a return to top flight football for the first time since the 1994–95 season, after being crowned champions of Championship 1. However, they were unable to adapt to the step up in quality and lasted only one season in the top flight, finishing the 2011–12 IFA Premiership in last place which resulted in relegation back down to Championship 1 for the 2012–13 season.

On 25 April 2015, Carrick sealed promotion back to the Premiership as champions following a 1–0 win over Dundela.

In the 2015–16 season they performed reasonably well in their first season back in the Premiership for three years getting good wins against the likes of Dungannon Swifts back to back and also on the first day of the season, an incredible 4–3 home victory over champions Crusaders and got draws with Glenavon, Portadown and Linfield. They secured their survival in the NIFL Premiership on the last day of the season after two late goals from Mark Surgeoner and Miguel Chines against Ballinamallard; Miguel's goal coming in the 90+3-minute after an incredible acrobatic effort to keep the 'Gers up.

The following season manager Gary Haveron left the club and the Gers appointed former Portadown long time assistant to Ronnie McFall Kieran Harding. Hardings reign was an unsuccessful one with the Amber Army's only win coming at a 1–0 win over a struggling Glentoran with the 'Gers getting beat comfortably by nearly every team in the league with them most notably losing 4–1 to Ballymena United, losing 4–0 to fellow strugglers Portadown team and 3–0 at home to Dungannon Swifts with Hardings resignation following. The club appointed former Crusaders and Bohemians manager Aaron Callaghan as Hardings replacement. A small upturn in form begun with Callaghan getting more favourable results and improving steadily. The Gers reached to League Cup Final in 2017 after beating Glenavon 1–0 at Mourneview Park but lost 2–0 to David Jeffrey's Ballymena United at Seaview on 18 February 2017. Following the cup final, positive results were rare, with the club falling further behind their rivals and starting to come dangerously close to basement team Portadown. Carrick eventually finished 11th and faced a relegation/promotion playoff against championship runners up Institute, which they convincingly won 5–2 on aggregate over the two legs. Following the resignation of Aaron Callaghan after the final game of the regular season, former Larne manager and Cliftonville player David McAlinden was appointed.

Another poor season led the team to 11th in the table; this was followed up by a 6-3 aggregate loss to Newry City, which of course meant relegation to the championship. Former Loughgall, Ards and Portadown manager Niall Currie then took over for the 2018–19 season.

Currie's side finished second in the Championship in the 2018–19 season behind runaway leaders Larne. This earned them a place in the Promotion play-off, first against third place finishers Portadown, with the winner earning the right to face Ards, who finished 11th in the Premiership. After beating Portadown in the first round, Currie's side went on to beat former side Ards 3-1 on aggregate over two legs to earn promotion back to the top tier.

In December 2019, defender Jerry Thompson killed himself, aged 24. Tributes flooded in from all areas of the Northern Irish football community and prompted mourning for all in the local game. Following the tragedy, Carrick announced that the number 21 shirt would be retired in his memory.

European record

Having qualified for the 1976–77 European Cup Winners' Cup, the club very creditably defeated Aris Bonnevoie of Luxembourg 4–3 on aggregate in the first round, before going out 9–3 on aggregate to English club Southampton in the second round.

Current squad

Retired numbers
21 - In honour of former player Jerry Thompson who died suddenly in December 2019.

Honours

Senior honours
Irish Cup: 1
1975–76
County Antrim Shield: 1
1992–93

Intermediate honours
Irish League B Division/IFA Championship 1/NIFL Championship 1: 8 (inc. one shared)
1961–62, 1972–73, 1974–75, 1976–77 (shared), 1978–79, 1982–83, 2010–11, 2014–15
Irish Intermediate Cup: 4
1975–76, 1976–77, 2010–11, 2014–15
Intermediate League Cup: 1
2003–04
Steel & Sons Cup: 3
1961–62, 1967–68, 2014–15
Louis Moore Cup: 2
1963–64, 1969–70
Northern Amateur Football League: 2
1948–49, 1951–52

Junior honours
Minor League: 1
1941–42
County Antrim Junior Shield: 1
1941–42

References

External links
 Carrick Rangers FC Website

coordinates         = 

Association football clubs established in 1939
Association football clubs in Northern Ireland
Carrickfergus
Association football clubs in County Antrim
1939 establishments in Northern Ireland
NIFL Championship clubs